Kainat Imtiaz (اردو: کائنات امتیاز) (born 21 June 1992) is a Pakistani cricketer who plays as an all-rounder, batting right-handed and bowling right-arm medium-fast, for Pakistan. She has also played domestic cricket for Karachi, Sindh, Omar Associates, Saif Sports Saga, State Bank of Pakistan and Zarai Taraqiati Bank Limited. She is daughter of umpire Saleema Imtiaz.

Early life and education
Kainat Imtiaz was born on 21 June 1992 in Karachi. Her early education started from Aga Khan School. She got admission in Hamdard Public School when she reached class III. She passed her intermediate from Aga Khan Higher Secondary School, Karachi (AKHSS) in 2010.

During the 2005 Women's Asia Cup in Pakistan, Kainat met Indian fast bowler Jhulan Goswami and decided to become a fast bowler. Kainat Imtiaz got married on 30 March 2022 to Mohammad Waqar Uddin.

Career

In 2007, she represented her school as the captain and fast bowler in the U-17 Cricket tournament organized by Pakistan Cricket Board. She was declared Player of the Tournament; the prize was awarded by Dr. Muhammad Ali Shah. In the same year she took first position in myriad of Athletic activities like 200M, 400M, Shot-put, and Relay Race. She traveled to Hyderabad to play the first ever U-17 Women Cricket Tournament as captain of the Karachi Team. She was later selected for the Pakistan Camp held in Karachi for the World Cup qualifying round. She was the youngest player in the probables of 30 players. In 2008, she played her second U-17 Women Cricket tournament held in Lahore as a captain. In the same year, she played Regional tournaments held in Hyderabad and Lahore organized by Pakistan Cricket Board and her team won the tournament. She was selected for Pakistan Camp for the 2009 Women's Cricket World Cup which was held in Australia. She was the youngest player in the squad and after a camp of one month she was selected as a reserve player for the World Cup Team. During 2008, she went to China representing Pakistan in the Super Sixes tournament. She played her first 20–20 Quadrangular Women Cricket tournament as a strike fast bowler of the south zone team. Kainat joined the PIA Cricket Academy sharpening her skills under the supervision of coaches including Azeem Hafiz, Zahid, Sajid and Sagheer Abbas (younger brother Zaheer Abbas). She was selected for 16th Asian Games held in Guangzhou.

Kainat Imtiaz was recalled in the touring party of 17 for the three ODIs and T20Is each. A 17-player squad was announced for the three ODIs and as many T20Is, as Pakistan prepare for the Women's World Cup Qualifier in July 2021 for the main event in early 2022 in New Zealand. She was recalled after an impressive show in the domestic circuit. She averaged 111 from four games with a half-century and also picked up three wickets with her medium pace.

In October 2021, she was named in Pakistan's team for the 2021 Women's Cricket World Cup Qualifier tournament in Zimbabwe. In May 2022, she was named in Pakistan's team for the cricket tournament at the 2022 Commonwealth Games in Birmingham, England.

References

External links
 
 

1992 births
Living people
Cricketers from Karachi
Pakistani women cricketers
Pakistan women One Day International cricketers
Pakistan women Twenty20 International cricketers
Karachi women cricketers
Sindh women cricketers
Omar Associates women cricketers
Saif Sports Saga women cricketers
State Bank of Pakistan women cricketers
Zarai Taraqiati Bank Limited women cricketers
Asian Games gold medalists for Pakistan
Asian Games medalists in cricket
Cricketers at the 2010 Asian Games
Cricketers at the 2014 Asian Games
Medalists at the 2010 Asian Games
Medalists at the 2014 Asian Games
Cricketers at the 2022 Commonwealth Games
Commonwealth Games competitors for Pakistan